Araz Artinian is an Armenian filmmaker and documentarian. She was born Montreal, Quebec.

In 1999, she started working with Atom Egoyan as Head Researcher for his feature film Ararat which was premiered at the 2002 Cannes Film Festival. 

The Genocide in Me is the latest documentary she wrote, filmed, and directed.

References

External links
The Genocide in Me
Twenty Voices - Artinian's documentary website
Araz Artinian at ArmeniaPedia.org

Year of birth missing (living people)
Living people
Canadian people of Armenian descent